Echiuroidea is an order of annelids in the class Polychaeta.

Families
Suborder Bonelliida
Bonelliidae Lacaze-Duthiers, 1858
Ikedidae Bock, 1942
Suborder Echiurida
Echiuridae de Quatrefages, 1847
Thalassematidae Forbes & Goodsir, 1841
Urechidae Monro, 1927

References

Echiurans
Protostome orders